Michael Drobil (19 September 1877 – 12 September 1958) was an Austrian sculptor. His work was part of the sculpture event in the art competition at the 1948 Summer Olympics.

References

1877 births
1958 deaths
20th-century Austrian sculptors
Austrian male sculptors
Olympic competitors in art competitions
Artists from Vienna
20th-century Austrian male artists